Roberta Spear (1948 in Hanford, California – 2003) was an American poet.

Life
Her work appeared in Field, Ploughshares, Poetry, and The Missouri Review.  She lived in Fresno, California.

Awards
 Ingram Merrill Fellowship
 1979 National Poetry Series

Works
"The Workout", The Atlantic, December 2002 
"Conversions", Ploughshares, Winter 1988 

Talking to Water (Holt, Rinehart & Winston, 1985)

Anthologies

References

External links
"Roberta Spear (1948-2003)", The Washington Post, June 1, 2003
"Article: Roberta Spear (1948-2003)", The Washington Post

1948 births
2003 deaths
20th-century American poets
American women poets
20th-century American women writers
21st-century American women